Jastrzębiec may refer to the following places:
 Jastrzębiec, Włocławek County in Kuyavian-Pomeranian Voivodeship (north-central Poland)
 Jastrzębiec, Sępólno County in Kuyavian-Pomeranian Voivodeship (north-central Poland)
 Jastrzębiec, Świętokrzyskie Voivodeship (south-central Poland)
 Jastrzębiec, Subcarpathian Voivodeship (south-east Poland)
 Jastrzębiec, Masovian Voivodeship (east-central Poland)
 Jastrzębiec, Greater Poland Voivodeship (west-central Poland)
 Jastrzębiec, Lubusz Voivodeship (west Poland)

See also
 Jastrzębiec coat of arms